Colobothea leucophaea is a species of beetle in the family Cerambycidae. It was described by Bates in 1865. It is known from Mexico.

References

leucophaea
Beetles described in 1865